Peachtree Road is the twenty-seventh studio album by English musician Elton John released on 9 November 2004. The album was named after Peachtree Road, the northern part of Peachtree Street in Atlanta, where one of John's four homes is located. This is the only album during his long career on which John has sole credit as producer, although on some previous projects he was listed as a co-producer, with Clive Franks (on A Single Man, 21 at 33 and parts of The Fox), or Greg Penny (on Duets and Made in England). It was recorded in January 2004.

Despite its generally positive reviews, Peachtree Road was one of John's lowest-selling contemporary efforts, reaching No. 17 in the US upon its release, yet only managing No. 21 in the UK, making it one of his rare albums to miss the top ten in his homeland. In the US, it was certified gold in December 2004 by the RIAA. It debuted at No. 12 in Denmark in November 2004, its highest chart placing in that country and peaked at No. 11 in Switzerland.

Background
In addition to Nigel Olsson playing drums on all tracks, once again a permanent member of John's touring and recording band, the album features renowned gospel vocalist Adam McKnight, as well as members of Chicago contributing horns and brass arrangements. Guy Babylon was credited with playing Hammond organ and Rhodes piano instead of keyboards, which was the case on earlier albums. John Jorgenson, a member of John's band from 1995 to 2000, plays pedal steel guitar on "Turn the Lights Out When You Leave".

It was dedicated to the memory of Gus and Sheila Dudgeon, John's original producer and his wife, who were killed in a car accident in 2002.

The album was re-released in July 2005 with three bonus tracks from Billy Elliot the Musical, as well as a DVD featuring nine tracks from the album performed live in Atlanta. The song "Electricity" from the musical was also released as a single in June 2005. It rose to No. 4 in the UK.

Some editions of the album included bonus - two videos for the two first singles ("Answer in the Sky" and "All That I'm Allowed").

Album cover
The album art on the front cover is a photograph from a railroad crossing near the Atlanta suburb of Douglasville, taken by London photographer Sam Taylor-Wood. Taken in by the American South and given complete artistic freedom, she shot thousands of photos during her week-long trip. The trip included other towns like Unadilla and Forsyth in Georgia. While she also visited Peachtree Road in the Buckhead area of Atlanta, she thought it was too busy for the album's more mellow nature. She picked several photos to present to him, and John made the final selection. Other photos from the shoot appear on the back of the album cover and in the included CD and SACD booklet.

Debut performance

Songs from the album debuted at The Tabernacle in Atlanta in early November. John also performed at the November 2005 Country Music Association Awards, televised live from Madison Square Garden, duetting with Dolly Parton on "Turn the Light Out When You Leave".

Singles
 "Answer in the Sky" was picked as the first single on the album that only released in North America, it reached No. 7 in the Adult Contemporary chart. The song ends his streak of hitting the Top 10 on that chart as a solo performer. John still charted there, however after this song, his singles only reached the Top 20. This song became John's most recent single on the AC chart to reach the Top 10 in 17 years until 2021's "Cold Heart (Pnau remix)" featuring Dua Lipa, which peaked at No. 1 (originally No. 5). The music video of the song, directed by David LaChapelle, features professional dancers dancing in different places built on the studio.
 "All That I'm Allowed", the first single released outside North America. It reached No. 20 in the UK Singles Chart and No. 24 in the US Adult Contemporary Chart. The music video features different people in their respective states, emphasizing the message and meaning of this song.
 "Turn the Lights Out When You Leave" was the last single released from the album, it reached No. 32 on the UK Singles Chart. The music video, directed by Sam Taylor-Wood, shot outside Los Angeles featuring Thomas Jane and Desperate Housewives star Teri Hatcher doing their roles and John as a piano player in the background, performing this song.

Track listing

Notes
 Track 8 was titled All That I'm Allowed on the original 2004 release of the album but was titled All That I'm Allowed (I'm Thankful) on the 2005 expanded edition. 
 All tracks on the DVD recorded live at the Tabernacle, Atlanta (November 2004).

Personnel 
 Elton John – lead vocals, acoustic piano, backing vocals (1, 3, 4, 6, 7, 8, 10, 12), Rhodes piano (10)
 Guy Babylon – programming, orchestral arrangements (1-5, 7-12), Hammond organ (2-9, 11, 12), Rhodes piano (6-9, 11)
 Davey Johnstone – electric guitar, acoustic guitar (1-4, 7, 8, 9, 11, 12), dobro (1, 2, 6, 10), backing vocals (1, 5, 10), baritone guitar (3, 6),  slide guitar (3, 5, 10), Leslie guitar (5), sitar (8), mandolin (10)
 John Jorgenson – pedal steel guitar (4)
 Bob Birch – bass, backing vocals (1, 5, 10)
 Nigel Olsson – drums, backing vocals (1, 5, 10, 11)
 John Mahon – percussion, backing vocals (1, 5, 10), programming (9, 11)
 Larry Klimas – baritone saxophone (6)
 Walter Parazaider – tenor saxophone (6)
 James Pankow – trombone (6), horn arrangements (6)
 Lee Loughnane – trumpet (6)
 Martin Tillman – electric cello (10)

Orchestra (Tracks 1-5 & 7-12)
 Steve Erodody and Martin Tillman – cello
 Brian Dembrow, Vicki Miskolczy, Simon Oswell and Jimbo Ross – viola 
 Charlie Bisharat, Joel Derouin, Bruce Dukow, Endre Granat, Eric Hosler, Dimitrie Leiviachi, Phillip Levy, Robin Olson, Sid Page, Mark Robinson, Anatoly Rosinsky and Lisa Sutton – violin

Choir vocals
 Charles Bullock (2, 7, 8, 9, 11, 12)
 Terrence Davis (2, 6-9, 11, 12)
 Todd Honeycutt (2, 6)
 Adam McKnight (2, 6-9, 11, 12)
 Rosalind McKnight (2, 3, 6)
 L'Tanya Shields (2, 3, 6)
 M. Denise Sims (2, 3, 6)
 Alecia Terry (2, 3, 6)
 Mark Ford (6-9, 11, 12)

Production 
 Produced by Elton John
 Engineered and Mixed by Matt Still 
 Assistant Engineers – Jason Carson, John Holmes, Josh McDonnell, Josh "Frodo" Monroy, Rob Skipworth and Tom Tapley.
 Mixed at Right Track Recording (New York, NY).
 Mastered by Bob Ludwig at Gateway Mastering (Portland, ME).
 Keyboard Technicians – Tony Smith and Dale Sticha
 Guitar Technician – Rick Salazar
 Drum Technician – Chris Sobchack
 Photography – Sam Taylor-Wood
 Design – Intro
 Management – Keith Bradley, Derek MacKillop and Frank Presland for Twenty First Artist, Ltd.

Charts

Weekly charts

Certifications

References

External links

2004 albums
Albums produced by Elton John
Elton John albums
Music of Atlanta